Hippomenella is a genus of bryozoans belonging to the family Romancheinidae.

The genus has almost cosmopolitan distribution.

Species:

Hippomenella alifera 
Hippomenella amaralae 
Hippomenella angustaedes 
Hippomenella avicularis 
Hippomenella axiculata 
Hippomenella bituberosa 
Hippomenella bragai 
Hippomenella burdigalensis 
Hippomenella chepigae 
Hippomenella convexa 
Hippomenella coronula 
Hippomenella devatasae 
Hippomenella fiski 
Hippomenella fissurata 
Hippomenella flava 
Hippomenella gigantica 
Hippomenella grandirostris 
Hippomenella infratelum 
Hippomenella konnoi 
Hippomenella ligulata 
Hippomenella magna 
Hippomenella magnifica 
Hippomenella mitzopoulosi 
Hippomenella moodysbranchensis 
Hippomenella mortenseni 
Hippomenella mucronata 
Hippomenella mucronelliformis 
Hippomenella parviporosa 
Hippomenella punctata 
Hippomenella pungens 
Hippomenella ramula 
Hippomenella rarirostrata 
Hippomenella rudicula 
Hippomenella semilaevis 
Hippomenella transversata 
Hippomenella transversora 
Hippomenella tuberosa 
Hippomenella uniserialis 
Hippomenella vellicata 
Hippomenella vermicularis

References

Bryozoan genera